Peter Louis Vincent de Freitas (2 August 1961 – 14 June 1989) was an English musician and producer. He was the drummer in Echo & the Bunnymen, and performed on their first five albums.

De Freitas was born in Port of Spain, Trinidad and Tobago, and educated by the Benedictines at Downside School in Somerset, south-west England. His father, Denis, was a copyright lawyer. He joined the Bunnymen in 1979, replacing a drum machine. Bunnymen's singer Ian McCulloch related that they told him "to get stuck into the toms. Budgie [from the Banshees] was the only other drummer doing that stuff at the time and Pete loved his drumming".

He funded, produced and played drums under the name Louis Vincent on the first single of the Wild Swans, "The Revolutionary Spirit", in 1982, for the Zoo Records label.

In 1985, de Freitas temporarily left the band. He spent several months drinking in New Orleans, while attempting to form a new group, the Sex Gods. By 1987, he returned to the Bunnymen to record their fifth album, though only as a part-time member. He was married in the same year and his daughter Lucie Marie was born in 1988.

De Freitas died in a motorcycle accident in 1989 at the age of 27, on his way to Liverpool from London. He was riding a 900cc Ducati motorcycle on the A51 road in Longdon Green, Staffordshire when he collided with a motor vehicle at approximately 16:00. His ashes are buried in Goring-on-Thames.

His sisters Rose and Rachel were founding members of the band the Heart Throbs. His brother Frank is the bass player of the Woodentops.

See also
27 Club
The Colourfield
The Wild Swans

References

External links

 

People educated at Downside School
1961 births
1989 deaths
Trinidad and Tobago drummers
British male drummers
New wave drummers
English people of Trinidad and Tobago descent
Echo & the Bunnymen members
The Wild Swans members
Motorcycle road incident deaths
Road incident deaths in England
20th-century British musicians
Trinidad and Tobago people of Portuguese descent
20th-century male musicians